Rhodesia was an unrecognised state in southern Africa from 1965 to 1979, equivalent in territory to modern Zimbabwe. It was previously the colony of Rhodesia, and before that the colony of Southern Rhodesia.

Rhodesia may also refer to:
Rhodesia (region), a historical region in southern Africa between 1891 and 1964
 Southern Rhodesia, now Zimbabwe
 Northern Rhodesia, now Zambia
Rhodesia, Nottinghamshire, a village in England
Rhodesia (moth), a genus of Geometrinae moths
Rhodesia (novel), a novel in the Nick Carter-Killmaster series
1197 Rhodesia, an asteroid
Rhodesia, a fungus in Ascomycota phylum

See also
Zimbabwe (disambiguation)